The ceremonial county of Cambridgeshire, which includes the unitary authority of Peterborough, has returned 7 MPs to the UK Parliament since 1997.

The modern county incorporates the historic counties of Cambridgeshire and Huntingdonshire and part of Northamptonshire. Under the Local Government Act 1888, which created county councils, the Isle of Ely and the Soke of Peterborough were created as separate administrative counties, hived off from Cambridgeshire and Northamptonshire respectively. In 1965 the administrative counties of Cambridgeshire and the Isle of Ely, and Huntingdonshire and the Soke of Peterborough, were combined to form Cambridgeshire and Isle of Ely, and Huntingdon and Peterborough respectively. Subsequently, as a result of the local government reorganisation introduced by the Local Government Act 1972, which came into effect on 1 April 1974, these two counties were amalgamated.

Number of seats 
The table below shows the number of MPs representing Cambridgeshire (including Isle of Ely, Huntingdonshire and, from 1974, Peterborough) at each major redistribution of seats affecting the county.

1Prior to 1950, seats were classified as County Divisions or Parliamentary Boroughs. Since 1950, they have been classified as County or Borough Constituencies.

Timeline 

Additionally, Cambridge University returned two Members of Parliament from 1603 to 1950. However it was not a geographic area and instead represented the graduates of the university.

Boundary reviews

See also 

 List of parliamentary constituencies in Cambridgeshire

References 

History of Cambridgeshire
Parliamentary constituencies in the East of England
Parliamentary constituencies in the East of England (historic)